Duncan McLean Marshall (September 24, 1872 – January 16, 1946) was a Canadian journalist, publisher, rancher and politician in the provinces of Ontario and Alberta.

Marshall represented the electoral district of Olds in the Legislative Assembly of Alberta, and served in the Cabinet of Premiers Alexander Cameron Rutherford, Arthur Sifton, and Charles Stuart as Alberta's second Minister of Agriculture from 1909 to 1921. Marshall later severed as a Ontario Member of Provincial Parliament in Ontario for the electoral district of Peel, and was appointed to the Cabinet of Premier Mitchell Hepburn, serving as the Ontario's Minister of Agriculture from 1934 to 1937. Marshall was then appointed to the Senate of Canada in 1938, serving as a Senator from Ontario until his death in 1946.

Early life
Marshall was born on September 24, 1872, in Elderslie Township, Ontario, to John Marshall and Margaret McMurchy. Marshall attended Walkerton High School and the Owen Sound Collegiate and Vocational Institute.

Marshall's first employment was as a teacher at Gillies Hill, Ontario, Canada.

By 1891 he was involved in the Patrons of Industry movement and was identified as an organizer with the fraternal agricultural organization. In 1895 he was sent to Prince Edward Island and began organizing there and in Nova Scotia and New Brunswick.  Early success led to the creation of weekly newspaper under the banner The Patron of Industry in January 1896 but it was closed in November of the same year. During the period Marshall attempted to turn to organization into a political party in the province but did not succeed and he returned to Ontario. The Patrons of Industry was disbanded in 1898.

Marshall moved on to become the Grand Secretary and editor and publisher of the official organ of the Order of Good Templars, a temperance organization.

He later moved to Toronto where he was involved in newspaper publishing and eventually acquired a number of farm interest weeklies. Marshall made his first run at federal politics running in the Muskoka riding in the 1904 Canadian federal election he was defeated by Conservative candidate William Wright.

In 1905 Marshall moved to Alberta and was for three years managing editor of the Edmonton Bulletin. He subsequently purchased a farm near Olds, Alberta and found success as a cattle and horse breeder. He owned The Olds Gazette, a weekly newspaper in Olds, Alberta.

Alberta politics
Marshall was an organizer for the Liberal Party of Alberta during Alberta's first provincial election in 1905. The Conservative leaning Calgary Herald wrote a scathing article on his political history during the run-up to the election, describing Marshall as a carpet-bagger. Marshall was elected to the Legislative Assembly of Alberta for the first time in the 1909 Alberta general election to the new Olds electoral district. He won the new district easily over Conservative candidate George McDonald.

Marshall was appointed to cabinet by Premier Alexander Cameron Rutherford to serve as the new Minister of Agriculture and Provincial Secretary November 1, 1909, following the resignation of William Finlay due to his poor health. Shortly after the 1909 election, Rutherford's government came under intense scrutiney when they were accused of giving loan guarantees to private interests for the construction of the Alberta and Great Waterways (A&GW) Railway that substantially exceeded the cost of construction, and which paid interest considerably above the market rate. They were also accused of exercising insufficient oversight over the railway's operations. The Alberta and Great Waterways Railway scandal reached the tipping point when Attorney General Charles Wilson Cross suddenly resigned from cabinet on March 9, 1910. In the next day there were unsubstantiated rumors that Marshall and Minister without Portfolio Prosper-Edmond Lessard had also resigned, though these proved false. Rutherford held his silence until March 11, when he told the legislature that he had not accepted any resignations. He said that the only vacant cabinet post was the ministry of Public Works previously held by Cushing, and that he hoped to fill it soon. A commission of inquiry was called, and Premier Rutherford eventually stepped down on May 26, 1909.

Marshall would be re-appointed Minister of Agriculture under the new government of Arthur Lewis Sifton on June 1, 1910, but his provincial secretary position would be given to Archibald J. McLean. Marshall was the only member of Rutherford's cabinet to carry on in the new Sifton cabinet.

One of his most notable achievements as Minister of Agriculture was the creation and setup of Demonstration Farms around the province in 1911. These farms would evolve into Agriculture training schools. The most notable of these schools are still in operation today as Lakeland College and Olds College.  Duncan Marshall Place, the main administrative building at Olds College, is named after him.

Marshall would seek a second term in office in the 1913 Alberta general election. In that election he would defeat Conservative challenger George Cloakey by just 54 votes.

Cloakley would run against Marshall again in the 1917 Alberta general election but would not succeed in defeating Marshall the second time, instead Marshall substantially widened his plurality winning comfortably.

The 1921 Alberta general election proved to be the end of the Liberal government and Marshall's political career in Alberta. The Charles Stewart led Liberals were defeated by the United Farmers of Alberta losing control of the legislature. Marshall lost his seat to United Farmers candidate Nelson S. Smith, who received 60.5 per cent of the vote. Historian Lewis Thomas credits the collapse of the Liberal Party and rise of the United Farmers to the sudden collapse of agricultural prices, the post-war economy and the organizational superiority of the United Farmers.

After Marshall's defeat in the provincial election, he ran for the Liberal Party of Canada for the second time in the 1921 Canadian federal election in East Calgary. He was defeated by William Irvine and finished the race a distant third.

Ontario legislature
Marshall was elected to the Legislative Assembly of Ontario for the Ontario Liberal Party in the 1934 Ontario general election for the Peel electoral district. In that election, he defeated longtime incumbent Conservative Thomas Kennedy. He was appointed Minister of Agriculture from July 10, 1934, to October 12, 1937, serving one term in the legislature. Upon his appointment to the cabinet, he became one of the few in Canadian history to hold the same ministerial portfolio in two different provinces.

Marshall and Kennedy would face each other again in the 1937 Ontario general election; this time, the results would be reversed, with Kennedy defeating Marshall.

Senate appointment
Marshall was appointed to the Senate of Canada on January 20, 1938, by William Lyon Mackenzie King. He served in the Senate representing the Liberal Party of Canada until his death on January 16, 1946.

References

Works cited

External links
 

1872 births
1946 deaths
Candidates in the 1904 Canadian federal election
Candidates in the 1921 Canadian federal election
Alberta Liberal Party MLAs
Canadian senators from Ontario
Ontario Liberal Party MPPs
Liberal Party of Canada senators
Members of the Executive Council of Alberta
Members of the Executive Council of Ontario
Liberal Party of Canada candidates for the Canadian House of Commons